Tadlapalle (Village ID 574699) is a village and panchayat in Ranga Reddy district, Andhra Pradesh, India. It falls under Shabad mandal. According to the 2011 census it has a population of 3946 living in 911 households. Its main agriculture product are rice and cotton growing.

References

Villages in Ranga Reddy district